ISO-IR-200 is a modification of ISO/IEC 8859-5 which added the letters to support Kildin Sami, Komi, and Nenets. It was created on May 1, 1998 by Everson Gunn Teoranta, which includes Michael Everson, among others.

Codepage layout

See also 
 Mac OS Barents Cyrillic: MacCyrillic derivative created for the same languages, also with Michael Everson's involvement.

References

ISO/IEC 8859
Computer-related introductions in 1988